Behind the Candelabra: My Life with Liberace is a memoir by Scott Thorson and Alex Thorleifson, published in 1988 by Dutton, and reissued in 2013. In 2009, it was reported that Thorson was working on a sequel, but as of 2021 this has not materialized.

Plot
Scott Thorson recounts his relationship with the entertainer and pianist Liberace.

Film adaptation
The memoir was adapted for a television film, Behind the Candelabra, directed by Steven Soderbergh, starring Michael Douglas and Matt Damon, and premiered on HBO on May 26, 2013.

See also

References

External links
Behind the Candelabra at Google Books
Behind the Candelabra (2013 TV film) at IMDB
Behind the Candelabra at Tantor Media
Lovers of the Rich and Famous: The Scott Thorson story @ Nightcharm

1988 American novels
American autobiographical novels
American novels adapted into films
Dutton Penguin books
Collaborative non-fiction books